Álvar Núñez Cabeza de Vaca is an outdoor sculpture of the Spanish explorer of the same name by Pilar Cortella de Rubin, installed at Hermann Park's McGovern Centennial Gardens in Houston, Texas, in the United States. The bronze bust rests on a granite pedestal and was acquired by the City of Houston in 1986.

See also
 List of public art in Houston

References

Bronze sculptures in Texas
Busts in Texas
Hermann Park
Monuments and memorials in Texas
Outdoor sculptures in Houston
Sculptures of men in Texas
Spanish-American culture in Texas